Nassau may refer to:

Places

Bahamas
Nassau, Bahamas, capital city of the Bahamas, on the island of New Providence

Canada
Nassau District, renamed Home District, regional division in Upper Canada from 1788 to 1792
Nassau Street (Winnipeg), Manitoba
Nassau Street, Toronto

Cook Islands
Nassau (Cook Islands), one of the Northern Cook Islands

Germany
 Nassau, Rhineland-Palatinate, a town founded in AD 915
 Nassau (region), the broader geographical and historical region comprising the former independent country Nassau
 Nassau (Verbandsgemeinde), an administrative district including the town of Nassau and its surrounding areas
 County of Nassau, a German state within the Holy Roman Empire during the Middle Ages, or one of its many successor counties
 Duchy of Nassau, an independent German state between 1806 and 1866 and the ultimate successor of the medieval county
 Hesse-Nassau, a Prussian province formed following their annexation of the Duchy of Nassau (along with other territories)
 Province of Nassau, a short-lived province of Nazi Germany (1944–1945) created from the formal division of Hesse-Nassau 
 Nassau Castle, the ancestral seat of the House of Nassau
 Nassau Nature Park, a major nature park in Germany located within the historical state of Nassau
 Nassau, Saxony, a village in the Ore Mountains

Hong Kong
Nassau Street, Lai Chi Kok, Kowloon

Indonesia
Nassau, a subdistrict in Toba Samosir Regency, North Sumatra
Nassau Range, alternate name of the Sudirman Range in Indonesia

Ireland
Nassau Street, Dublin

Jamaica
 Nassau Valley

Netherlands
Baarle-Nassau, a town in the southern Netherlands

Taiwan
 historic name for Taitung City

United States
 Nassau, Delaware
 Nassau County, Florida
 Nassau Village-Ratliff, Florida
 Nassau, Minnesota
 Nassau, New York (disambiguation)
 East Nassau, New York
 Nassau (town), New York, in Rensselaer County
 Nassau (village), New York 
 Nassau County, New York, on Long Island
 Nassau Island, former name of Long Island
 Nassau Lake in Rensselaer County
 Nassau Lake, New York, corresponding census-designated place
 Nassau Street (Manhattan), New York City
 Nassau Street (Princeton, New Jersey)
 Nassau Bay, Texas

People

Nobles
 House of Nassau, a European aristocratic dynasty
 House of Orange-Nassau, a noble dynasty from the Netherlands
 Louis of Nassau (1538–1574), Dutch general
 Maurice of Nassau, Prince of Orange (1567–1625), Dutch stadtholder 
 Sophia of Nassau (1836–1913), Queen consort of Sweden and Norway
 William Nassau de Zuylestein, 4th Earl of Rochford (1717–1781), British courtier, diplomat, and statesman
 House of Nassau-Siegen
 John Maurice of Nassau (1604–1679), Dutch colonial governor
 House of Nassau-Weilburg, a noble dynasty from Germany, monarchs of Luxembourg
 Adolf of Nassau (disambiguation)
 Adolph of Nassau-Weilburg (disambiguation)
 Maria of Nassau (disambiguation)
 William of Nassau (disambiguation)

Surname
Charles William Nassau (1804–1878), Presbyterian minister, president of Lafayette College

People with the given name
Nassau William Senior (1790–1864), English lawyer and economist

Ships
, a UK Royal Navy name for many ships
HNLMS Johan Maurits van Nassau, ships of the Netherlands navy
MV Queen of Nassau, name of HMCS Canada after exiting government service
Nassau-class battleship, an Imperial German battleship class
SMS Nassau, a 1908 German battleship
SS Nassau, a steam turbine-driven twin-screw passenger-and-cargo ocean liner, launched in 1928
, a U.S. Navy ship name for multiple ships
Nassau (steamboat), the first steam ferry, built by Robert Fulton

Other uses
 Nassau (album), a 1995 album by The Sea and Cake
 Nassau (bet), a type of bet between golfers
 Nassau (Staten Island Railway station), United States
 Nassau Coliseum, an arena in Uniondale, New York, United States
 Nassau Fjord, in Prince William Sound, Alaska
 Nassau grouper, an endangered species of fish
 Nassau Hall, Princeton University, New Jersey, United States
 Nassau Light Railway, a German railway company
 Nassauische Neue Presse, a German newspaper in the Nassau area
 Nassau (crater), a lunar impact crater on the far side of the Moon
 Nassau Club, a private club in Princeton, New Jersey, founded by Woodrow Wilson

See also
 Battle of Nassau (disambiguation)
 Fort Nassau (disambiguation)
 Nassau County (disambiguation)
 Nassau Street (disambiguation)
 Orange-Nassau (disambiguation)